Brothers & Sisters is a family drama that  premiered on ABC on September 24, 2006, and concluded on May 8, 2011. A total of 109 episodes of Brothers & Sisters have aired over five seasons.

Series overview

Episodes

Season 1 (2006–07)

Season 2 (2007–08)

Season 3 (2008–09)

Season 4 (2009–10)

Season 5 (2010–11)

Notes

References

External links
 TV.com Brothers & Sisters Entry

Brothers and Sisters